The 1952 NBA World Championship Series was the championship round of the 1952 NBA Playoffs, which concluded the National Basketball Association (NBA)'s 1951–52 season. The Western Division champion Minneapolis Lakers faced the Eastern Division champion New York Knicks in a best-of-seven series with Minneapolis having home-court advantage.

Minneapolis won game one and the teams thereafter alternated victories, Minneapolis winning the decisive game by a 17-point margin at home on Friday, April 25.

All but Game 7 were played in the teams' secondary arenas: the Lakers played at the Saint Paul Auditorium, while the Barnum circus bumped the Knicks from Madison Square Garden to the 69th Regiment Armory.

The seven games were played in fourteen days, beginning Saturday and Sunday, April 12 and 13, in Minneapolis/St. Paul and returning to Minneapolis/St. Paul for games five and seven on the following Saturday and Friday. Meanwhile, three Wednesday or Friday games were played in New York City. The entire postseason tournament spanned 39 days in which Minneapolis played 13 games and New York 14.

Series summary

Lakers win series 4–3

Team rosters

Minneapolis Lakers

New York Knicks

References

External links
 1952 Finals at NBA.com
 1952 NBA Playoffs at Basketball-Reference.com

National Basketball Association Finals
Finals
NBA
NBA
NBA Finals
NBA Finals
Basketball competitions in New York City
Basketball competitions in Minneapolis
1950s in Minneapolis
NBA Finals
1950s in Manhattan
Rose Hill, Manhattan